An anti-discrimination law was published on 28 August 1999. It prohibits discriminatory practices based on race, skin colour, nationality and ethnic origin. According to the Portuguese Constitution, further discriminatory practices based on sex, race, language, origin territory, religion, political and ideological convictions, instruction level, economic situation, social condition or sexual orientation are also prohibited.

In Portugal, the number of attacks against Afro-Portuguese people and Romani people from one year to the next is uneven and those attacks are always promptly reported on the media and investigated by the police. Those two groups of people have also had a disproportionate representation in annual arrests, incarceration numbers and police reports across the country and throughout time. There are several anti-racism organizations in the country supporting victims of racism and raising awareness about racism and ethnic discrimination issues. Social integration-focused organizations and programs targeting ethnic minorities or groups within some ethnic minorities with a track record of social issues including crime, poverty and youth delinquency, are also pervasive in Portugal.

History

In the 8th century, Muslim armies sailed from North Africa and took control of Iberia. Known in Arabic as al-Andalus, the region joined the expanding Umayyad Empire and prospered under Muslim rule. However, dhimmi status led to continuing discrimination against Christians in those places.
 
Some Muslim Moors, mainly Arab and Berber people in origin, as well as Jews and Christian Mozarabs, were expelled out of the continent or fled from the reconquered territory, during the Catholic Reconquista and the expansion of the newly founded Kingdom of Portugal in the 12th and 13th centuries, after the conquest of the southern lands, including Lisbon, the Alentejo, and the Algarve. However, many adapted to the new Catholic rulers, often due to the coercive power of the ruling authority, and remained in the country mixing with the general population in every aspect of their lives. In Algarve and Lisbon, large swathes of Muslims of Arabic and Berber origin were assimilated into the general population of the Kingdom of Portugal during the process of Reconquista or in a few decades after its end. In several Portuguese regions such as Cova da Beira and Trás-os-Montes, Jews escaped the Portuguese Inquisition formally established in Portugal in 1536 and prospered as marranos and conversos, but many others across Portugal were persecuted, killed or forced to escape out of the Kingdom of Portugal.

The Atlantic slave trade started in 1444, when 235 people from the newly-discovered coast of West Africa where the Islamic slave trade had been established a long time ago were put up for sale in Lagos, currently a Portuguese beach resort on Europe's southwestern tip in Portugal's Algarve. Slavery would be abolished in Portugal in 1761 by the Marquês de Pombal. However, slavery within the African Portuguese colonies would only be fully abolished in 1869 due to that colonies' deep connections with the Brazilian slave trade.

In the second half of the 16th century, at the end of the Portuguese Age of Discovery and close to the apogee of the transcontinental Portuguese Empire, Lisbon was full of black people of African extraction who lived freely and naturally among the white locals of European ancestry. There were also black servants and black slaves as well as black slave traders established in the Portuguese city.

In the 20th century, the Portuguese authorities would formally develop and promote the concept of Lusotropicalism. In light of this theory and official policy, Portugal's most notable sports star (Eusébio da Silva Ferreira) and the most decorated military officer of the Portuguese Armed Forces (Marcelino da Mata) under the Estado Novo regime (1933-1974) designed and led by António de Oliveira Salazar, will be both black Portuguese citizens born and raised in Portugal's African territories. A large number of Portuguese military personnel employed during the Portuguese Colonial War (1961-1974) was also black African people.

Like the other countries of the Mediterranean, Portugal has witnessed a new phenomenon since the 1974 Carnation Revolution and the end of the Portuguese overseas empire: beyond the condition of country of emigration, it became at the same time a country of immigration. There was a very large flow of African immigrants, particularly coming from the former Portuguese colonies in Africa (collectively known as PALOP countries).

Immigration to Portugal before 1980 usually involved different groups (mainly Europeans and South Americans, in particular Brazilian immigrants), and a different socio-economic integration, than later immigrants.

The 1980s also saw racist attacks against certain immigrants by skinheads and the far-right National Action Movement, a fringe movement.

Since the 1990s, along with a boom in construction, several new waves of Brazilians, Romanians, and Moldovans have immigrated to Portugal. A number of British and Spanish people have also immigrated to Portugal, with the British community being mostly composed of retired pensioners and the Spaniards composed of professionals (medical doctors, business managers, businesspersons, nurses, etc.). Racism is usually related with ethnicity rather than nationality, with black people being the most common target, after Ciganos. The Ciganos were the object of fierce discrimination and persecution. The number of Ciganos in Portugal is about 40,000 to 50,000 spread all over the country. The majority of the Ciganos concentrate themselves in urban centers, where from the late 1990s to the 2000s, major public housing (bairros sociais) policies were targeted at them in order to promote social integration. However, this population is still characterised by very low levels of educational qualification, high unemployment, and crime rates. The Ciganos are the ethnic group that the Portuguese most reject and discriminate against, and are also targets for discriminatory practices from the State administration, namely at a local level, finding persistent difficulties in the access to job placement, housing and social services, as well as in the relation to police forces. There are also reports on discrimination of Ciganos by owners of small shops in many parts of the country, including businesses run by other ethnic minorities, such as the Chinese. There has also been incidents of minor discrimination towards Muslims due to the history of modern Islamic terrorism in the Western World and some practices considered iliberal or grotesque by locals such like female genital mutilation.

Starting in the late 2010s, the agenda of CHEGA party and its founder André Ventura, which is heavily focused on criminality, support for the police forces, and the misuse of public money in terms of corruption at the top, overstaffing in the civil service at the middle or undeserving welfare recipients at the bottom, includes extensive references to the Portuguese Gypsies which are often explicitly targeted by the party and its founder in such a manner that a number of fines and admonitions have been issued to them by the Commission for Equality and Against Racial Discrimination (CICDR). André Ventura has defended himself explaining that he isn't racist but against subsidy dependence and criminality. He said about the topic that "structural racism is a ghost that does not exist in Portugal, a ghost that they want to bring into the discussion of issues or to hide others, as was the case of Novo Banco, as was the case of several cases of corruption that we have learned about in recent weeks".

Laws
Law number 115 of 3 August 1999 introduced the legal recognition of immigrant associations as well as the technical and financial State support for the development of their activities. The High Commissioner gives this recognition for Immigrants and Ethnic Minorities to those associations that wish to be recognised as such, as long as they fulfil the appropriate conditions foreseen in the Law. These recognised associations may have the following rights: to participate in the definition of the immigrants policies; to participate in the legislative processes concerning immigration; to participate in the consultative bodies, in the terms defined by the law; to benefit from the right to public speech on the radio and television. Since the introduction of the law, already 25 immigrant associations have been legally recognised. The associations can be of national, regional or local scope, according to the number of members each association claims to have: that is, the number of associated members will determine if an association can be considered as being of local, regional or national range. An anti-discrimination Law was published on 28 August 1999. It prohibits discriminatory practices based on 'race', colour, nationality and ethnic origin. Article I states that the objective of this law is to prevent and prohibit racial discrimination in all its forms and sanction all acts that violate a person's basic rights or impede the exercise of economic, social or cultural rights for reasons such as nationality, colour, 'race' or ethnic origin. This Law also provides for an Advisory Committee for Equality and Against Racial Discrimination. Presided by the High Commissioner for Immigrants and Ethnic Minorities, the Committee is responsible for promoting studies on equality and racial discrimination, supervising enforcement of the law, and making legislative proposals considered suitable for the prevention of all forms of discrimination. The law number 20, of 6 July 1996, introduced the possibility for immigrants, anti-racist and human rights associations to assist in a legal action against discrimination, together with the victim and the Prosecution, i.e. to formulate an accusation and to introduce evidence into the penal process

Racism and the media
Portugal, as a new country of immigration since after the Carnation Revolution of 1974, has been witnessing the growing importance of all the issues related to the phenomena of racism and xenophobia. A typical feature is the positive complicity expressed and the accepted similarities between Africans and Portuguese as well as the absence of assumed and declared racist attitudes. Existing research has also made visible the role played by the mass media in the reproduction of discourses of antiracism, particularly when the press is dominated by some specific thematization, such is the case regarding the European Year Against Racism. In this case, the issue of racism even deserved being commented by specialists in the different analysed newspapers.

Notable incidents of racism
In an incident on February 5, 2015, eighteen police officers (PSP) tortured and beat a group of youths of African descent. The police officers originally lied about what had occurred, but a two-year investigation by the National Counterterrorism Unit (UNCT) and Public Ministry (MP) uncovered what had occurred. The MP concluded that the incident began with an arbitrary and violent arrest of a young man Bruno Lopes in a suburb of Lisbon, Amadora. Despite not resisting arrest, he was subject to racial slurs, and was beaten violently. As a result, 6 individuals (including mediators of youth associations who act as informal liaisons between members of the community and police) went to inquire about the arrest status of Bruno Lopes. Unprovoked, the MP found that police brutally attacked the 6 individuals, and used a number of racial slurs. The attack included physical beatings as well as the individuals being shot with rubber bullets. One police officer was reported to have said, "They're all going to die, you f*cking blacks." The 6 individuals were then detained for two days, during which beatings and torture continued. Much of the torture was explicitly motivated by racial hatred. One officer was reported to have said "You do not know how I hate your race, I want to exterminate you all from this land, you have to deport yourself, and if I told you, you would all be sterilized." Another said, "You're going to disappear, you, your race and your shitty neighborhood!" The two days of beatings reportedly left blood all over the floor, which investigators reported observing as members of the police station attempted to clean up the floor "stained red". Originally the internal inspection authority of the police had found no evidence of mistreatment, but the investigation by UNCT and MP demonstrated that this was categorically untrue.

As of September 7, 2017, it does not appear that any of the 18 officers have faced criminal justice for their actions. 4 of the 18 officers continue to work in the same police station. Others have left the station but it does not appear to be as a result of any penalty for their actions.

March 2020 A Portuguese court found three border force officers guilty of fatally beating a Ukrainian man detained at Lisbon Airport, in a case that has led the government to break up the country’s immigration service (SEF). Ihor Homenyuk, 42, died two days after being held on arrival. He slowly suffocated after being left alone, face down on the floor with several broken ribs, his hands cuffed behind his back and legs taped together, said a doctor who carried out the autopsy.

Racism and violent crime rise
Crime was a major source of discontent, and sentiment that Portugal was becoming increasingly unsafe since the country turned a destination to several thousand emigrants after 1990, led to the dismissal of Internal Administration Minister Fernando Gomes in the early 2000s on the heels of gang violence that made headlines. Along with the gang crime wave, which involved large groups of youths, many of them descendants of immigrants from the former Portuguese colonies in Africa who live in several neighbourhoods around Lisbon, wreaking havoc on commuter train lines and robbing gasoline (petrol) stations, the country was also shocked by attacks on nightclubs, and a rise of violent crime related with local and international organized crime which includes a number of gangs particularly active in Greater Lisbon and Greater Porto areas. A large proportion of convicts by violent crime are foreigners and many people tend easily to blame immigrants or ethnic minorities for that type of crime.

References

See also
 Environmental inequality in Europe
 Lusotropicalism
 Portuguese Inquisition

 
Human rights abuses in Portugal
Portugal
Portugal